Köhnə Xudat Qazmalar (also, Kohna Khudat Gazmalar) is a village and municipality in the Qusar District of Azerbaijan. It has a population of 663.

References 

Populated places in Qusar District